Television in the self-declared state of Northern Cyprus consists of nineteen TV channels. These are:

BRT 1
BRT Spor
TRT 1
TRT Çocuk
TRT Haber
Ada TV
ATV
GAÜ TV
Genç TV
Kanal D
Kanal Sim
Kanal T
Kıbrıs TV
LAÜ TV
Show TV
Sokak TV
Star TV
TV 2020
YDÜ TV

BRT is the state television of the Turkish Republic of Northern Cyprus. BRT is also the oldest Turkish Cypriot TV channel, established as a radio station in 1963, and launched its first television broadcast in 1976. Most of the TV channels in Northern Cyprus also broadcast via satellite, and there is a "Cyprus Packet" in the satellite of Türksat.

See also
TAK-Cyprus
Television in Cyprus

References

Mass media in Northern Cyprus